Ahmad Zigi Zaresta Yuda (born 14 January 1998) is an Indonesian karateka competing in the men's kata event. He won the gold medal in the men's individual kata event at the 2019 Southeast Asian Games held in Manila, Philippines. He also won the gold medal in the men's individual kata event at the 2021 Southeast Asian Games held in Hanoi, Vietnam.

At the 2017 Asian Karate Championships held in Astana, Kazakhstan, he won the silver medal in the men's kata event. He repeated this at the 2019 Asian Karate Championships held in Tashkent, Uzbekistan.

In 2018, he won one of the bronze medals in the men's kata event at the Asian Games held in Jakarta, Indonesia.

In June 2021, he competed at the World Olympic Qualification Tournament held in Paris, France hoping to qualify for the 2020 Summer Olympics in Tokyo, Japan. In November 2021, he competed in the men's individual kata event at the World Karate Championships held in Dubai, United Arab Emirates. In December 2021, he won the silver medal in his event at the Asian Karate Championships held in Almaty, Kazakhstan.

He won one of the bronze medals in the men's individual kata event at the 2021 Islamic Solidarity Games held in Konya, Turkey. He won the silver medal in the men's individual kata event at the 2022 Asian Karate Championships held in Tashkent, Uzbekistan.

Achievements

References 

Living people
1998 births
Place of birth missing (living people)
Indonesian male karateka
Karateka at the 2018 Asian Games
Medalists at the 2018 Asian Games
Asian Games medalists in karate
Asian Games bronze medalists for Indonesia
Southeast Asian Games medalists in karate
Southeast Asian Games gold medalists for Indonesia
Southeast Asian Games silver medalists for Indonesia
Competitors at the 2017 Southeast Asian Games
Competitors at the 2019 Southeast Asian Games
Competitors at the 2021 Southeast Asian Games
Islamic Solidarity Games medalists in karate
Islamic Solidarity Games competitors for Indonesia
21st-century Indonesian athletes